Keith Fitzpatrick Semple (born August 21, 1970) is a Guyanese cricketer who played for the West Indies in 1998/99. He has never had the chance to make a name for himself on the Test stage, but he was called up for One day matches during the 1998/99 season against South Africa.

Semple is a right-handed batsman and a fast pace bowler.

References

1970 births
Living people
West Indies One Day International cricketers
Guyanese cricketers
Guyana cricketers